Yuliya Igorevna Anashkina (born November 18, 1980 in Chusovoy, Perm Krai, Russian SFSR) is a Russian luger who has competed since 2000. She finished 16th in the women's singles event at the 2006 Winter Olympics in Turin.

Anashkina′s best finish at the FIL World Luge Championships was 19th in the women's singles event twice (2004, 2007).

References

 
 Julia ANASHKINA at The-Sports.org

External links
 

1980 births
Living people
People from Chusovoy
Sportspeople from Perm Krai
Russian female lugers
Olympic lugers of Russia
Lugers at the 2006 Winter Olympics